Fergus Kelly  is an academic at the Dublin Institute for Advanced Studies. His research interests centre on early Irish law-texts and wisdom-texts.

He graduated in 1967 in Early and Modern Irish from Trinity College Dublin. He spent a year in the University of Oslo's Linguistics Institute. He also taught a course in Celtic Civilisation at the University of Toronto. He is now a Senior Professor in the School of Celtic Studies (Irish: Scoil an Léinn Cheiltigh) of the Dublin Institute for Advanced Studies. In 2003 he delivered the British Academy's Sir John Rhŷs Memorial Lecture. A prolific author and researcher, he has written and edited a number of books and many articles including A guide to early Irish law. He co-edits the journal Celtica and has collaborated with many others including Thomas Charles-Edwards.

Awards and recognition
Kelly was granted the highest academic honour in Ireland, membership of the Royal Irish Academy in 2004.

Publications
Kelly's publications include:
 Audacht Morainn (Dublin 1976)
 A guide to early Irish law (Dublin 1988, reprinted 1991, 1995)
 Early Irish farming: the evidence of the law-texts (Dublin 1997, reprinted 1998)
 Marriage Disputes: A Fragmentary Old Irish Law-Text (Dublin, 2014)
 The Life & Work of Oisín Kelly (Carlow, 2015)
 The MacEgan legal treatise (Dublin, 2020). Edition of work by Giolla na Naomh Mac Aodhagáin.

References

External links
Professor Fergus Kelly , Dublin Institute of Advanced Studies webpage
 Fergus Kelly in the BBC's plantation series.
 Fergus Kelly speaks in Trinity College about 'Early Irish Music: An overview of the linguistic and documentary evidence'.

Alumni of Trinity College Dublin
Academics of the Dublin Institute for Advanced Studies
Living people
20th-century Irish people
21st-century Irish people
Year of birth missing (living people)